Eupithecia jinboi is a moth in the family Geometridae. It is found in Japan.

References

Moths described in 1976
jinboi
Moths of Japan